Ercole Visconti (1646–1712) was a Roman Catholic prelate who served as Titular Archbishop of Tamiathis (1678–1712), Apostolic Nuncio to Germany (1680–1687), and Apostolic Nuncio to Florence (1678–1680).

Biography
On 18 July 1678, he was appointed during the papacy of Pope Innocent XI as Titular Archbishop of Tamiathis.
On 31 July 1678, he was consecrated bishop by Carlo Pio di Savoia, Cardinal-Priest of San Crisogono, and Egidio Colonna, Titular Patriarch of Jerusalem, and Francesco Casati, Titular Archbishop of Trapezus, serving as co-consecrators. 
On 15 November 1678, he was appointed during the papacy of Pope Innocent XI as Apostolic Nuncio to Florence; he resigned on 13 October 1680.
On 12 October 1680, he was appointed during the papacy of Pope Innocent XI as Apostolic Nuncio to Germany; he resigned in July 1687.
He remained as Titular Archbishop of Tamiathis until his death in 1712.

Episcopal succession
While bishop, he was the principal co-consecrator of:
Wilhelm Egon von Fürstenberg, Bishop of Strasbourg (1683); 
and the principal co-consecrator of:
Franciscus Liberati, Titular Archbishop of Ephesus (1688);  
Petrus Draghi Bartoli, Titular Patriarch of Alexandria (1690); and
Baldassare Cenci (seniore), Titular Archbishop of Larissa in Thessalia (1691).

References

External links and additional sources
 (for Chronology of Bishops)  

17th-century Roman Catholic titular bishops
18th-century Roman Catholic titular bishops
Bishops appointed by Pope Innocent XI
1646 births
1712 deaths
Apostolic Nuncios to the Republic of Florence
Apostolic Nuncios to Germany